Convoy of Hope is an American nonprofit humanitarian and disaster relief organization that provides food, supplies, and humanitarian services to impoverished or otherwise needy populations throughout the world. The organization also engages in disaster relief work. It was founded in 1994 by Hal, Steve, and Dave Donaldson in Sacramento, California, later moved its headquartered to its currently place in Springfield, Missouri, and is associated with the Assemblies of God and its Chi Alpha campus ministries and fellowships.

History

Convoy of Hope was founded as a nonprofit organization in Sacramento, California in 1994 by Hal, Steve, and Dave Donaldson. The Donaldsons were spurred to start the charity because of the kindness shown to their family after their father was killed and their mother seriously injured in a 1969 car accident caused by a drunk driver. Hal also had an interaction with Mother Teresa in India in the late 1980s that further persuaded him to begin the organization. Initially, Hal Donaldson handed out food to the needy. In 1995, Convoy of Hope held its first large food distribution event in which they gave 700,000 pounds of food to 70,000 people. In 1996, Hal Donaldson was offered a job in Springfield, Missouri and moved Convoy of Hope's headquarters there as well.

Soon after the organization's arrival in Springfield, a local businessman donated a semi-truck and paid for a driver and fuel for one year. Fundraisers organized by the Assemblies of God helped bring in more trucks after that. In 2000, the organization purchased a 300,000 square-foot warehouse in Springfield to store its food and supplies. In 2005, Convoy of Hope provided $35 million (the equivalent of 700 truckloads) in goods for disaster relief in the aftermath of Hurricane Katrina. In 2006, the nonprofit provided access to food, medical assistance, clothing, and other services and resources to just under 4 million people. The following year, it began collaborating with the United States Agency for International Development (USAID) to offer meals to 12,000 children in Kenya, Haiti, Nicaragua, and El Salvador on a daily basis. In 2011, the Jonas Brothers donated $70,000 to Convoy of Hope to help fund the organization's children's feeding programs, which had expanded to Honduras and the Philippines. The musical group had previously donated $80,000 to fund Convoy of Hope's relief efforts after the 2010 Haiti earthquake.

In 2012, the organization provided aid to the victims of Hurricane Sandy in the Northeastern United States and Typhoon Bopha in the Philippines. By 2014, 20 years after its founding, Convoy had provided services to a total 67 million people in over 100 countries.

As of 2019, the organization has provided a total of $1 billion in food and aid, helping over 115 million people in the process. In October 2019, Convoy of Hope was given a 4-star rating for the 16th year in a row by Charity Navigator, a charity assessment organization. Four stars is the highest rating given by Charity Navigator.

Services

Convoy of Hope provides a variety of services to communities throughout the world. One of its primary functions is as a first responder organization in the wake of disasters. It maintains a fleet of tractor-trailers and other vehicles that can be deployed throughout the United States from its  warehouse in Springfield, Missouri. Other vehicles include a chainsaw trailer, mobile bunkhouses, and mobile bathrooms. The tractor trailers that arrive at disaster locations are designed to help Convoy of Hope workers "arrive self-sufficient and ready to provide aid." International relief efforts are often undertaken in collaboration with local organizations and churches. Convoy of Hope relies on donations, monetary contributions, and volunteer work to provide relief. It also partners with companies like Bass Pro Shops, The Home Depot, Culligan, Coca-Cola, and Hormel Foods (among others) that donate food and supplies for the organization's efforts.

Convoy of Hope hosts large-scale Community Events, mostly in locations throughout the United States. Convoy of Hope's Community Events deliver food, goods, and services totaling around $1 million in value. Some of the services provided for free include haircuts, dental exams, and health screenings. The events also often feature children's activities and live entertainment. Most of the goods and services are donated and volunteered by members of local businesses, churches, government agencies, and other nonprofit organizations. In 2018, the organization hosted 61 of these one-day events throughout the United States.

In 2003, Convoy of Hope started their Rural Compassion Initiative, which partners with churches, organizations, and other community leaders to provide resources, supplies, and training to rural communities in need. In 2017, the organization worked with 1,200 churches through its Rural Compassion Initiative to deliver 91,000 pairs of shoes to children in rural areas. The program also provides items like food, backpacks, toys, and other supplies for churches, schools, agencies, and other organizations in rural areas.

Convoy of Hope also operates a Women's Empowerment program that is designed to educate women and girls in vulnerable communities. It also provides entrepreneurial training and seed capital for women to start their own businesses. Around 2,800 women in nine different countries participated in these programs in 2017. Convoy of Hope also has a children's feeding program that provides daily meals to children in developing countries throughout the world. In 2019, the program was feeding 200,000 children per day in 14 countries. The program was originally started in 2006 in collaboration with USAID.

References

External links
 Official website

Companies based in Springfield, Missouri
Charities based in Missouri
Christian charities based in the United States
Development charities based in the United States
Christian organizations established in 1994
Christian relief organizations